Adriano José Lara (born December 9, 1987), better known as Adriano, is a Brazilian football player who acts as a right back for Maringá.

Career

He served from 2006 to 2008 in the J. Malucelli (current Paranaense Corinthians), where he became champion of the Copa Paraná in 2007. In early 2009 he went to Coritiba Football Club and eventually moved to Rio Ave, club Portugal. Currently, Adriano plays for Clube Atlético Paranaense on loan from Atletico Goianiense.

Adriano is a midfielder, whose caracretísticas kick with both legs, the pass and free kicks.

Honours
Maringá
Taça FPF: 2017

References

External links

zerozerofootball.com
Adriano José Lara at ZeroZero

1987 births
Living people
Brazilian footballers
Brazilian expatriate footballers
Rio Ave F.C. players
Coritiba Foot Ball Club players
Atlético Clube Goianiense players
Club Athletico Paranaense players
Primeira Liga players
Expatriate footballers in Portugal
Brazilian expatriate sportspeople in Portugal

Association football fullbacks